Uxbridge Township may refer to one of the following places:

In Canada

Uxbridge Township, Ontario County, Ontario

In the United States

Uxbridge Township, Barnes County, North Dakota

See also
Uxbridge (disambiguation)

Township name disambiguation pages